The Ashton–Driggs House on E. Battlecreek Rd. in Pleasant Grove, Utah, United States, was built in 1865.  Also known as the Benjamin W. Driggs House, it includes Greek Revival architecture.  It was listed on the National Register of Historic Places in 1972.

It is a stone house built of soft, tufa rock.  It was added to several times since its original construction.

References

Houses completed in 1865
Greek Revival houses in Utah
Houses on the National Register of Historic Places in Utah
Houses in Utah County, Utah
National Register of Historic Places in Utah County, Utah
Buildings and structures in Pleasant Grove, Utah